Candace Pauline Hopcus née Camp (May 23, 1949 in Amarillo, Texas) is an American writer of romance novels.  She has also published under the pen names Lisa Gregory, Sharon Stephens, Kristin James and under her maiden name Candace Camp.

Biography
Born Candace Pauline Camp on May 23, 1949 in Amarillo, Texas, she is the youngest of three children born to Lula Mae (Irons) and Grady Camp.  Writing came naturally to her—her mother had been a newspaper reporter, and her father was the business manager of the Amarillo, Texas newspaper. Camp began writing down her own stories when she was 10, and often wrote when she needed to relax.

Camp attended the University of Texas at Austin and West Texas State University before becoming a teacher in Eureka Springs, Arkansas. After moving to North Carolina, she took a job in the trust department of a bank.

Camp then began law school at the University of North Carolina at Chapel Hill.  At the same time, she began reading romance novels and decided to write one of her own.  Camp finished her first novel, Bonds of Love while in law school.  It was published in 1978 under the pen name Lisa Gregory.  In the ensuing years, Camp has published over 43 books under four names: Lisa Gregory, Kristin James, Sharon Stephens and Candace Camp.

Camp married in 1980 with Pete Hopcus, and had a daughter.

Bibliography

As Lisa Gregory

Single novels
Bonds of Love 1978
Analise 1981
Crystal Heart 1982
Bitterleaf	1983
Light and Shadows 1985
Solitaire 1988
Seasons 1990
Sisters 1991

The Rainbow's Turner Family series
The Rainbow Season	1979
The Rainbow Promise 1989

As Kristin James

Single novels
Cara's Song 1982
Dreams of Evening 1983
Morning Star 1984
Secret Fire 1984
A Wedding Gift 1985
A Very Special Favor 1986
Cutter's Lady 1986
Heartwood 1986
Satan's Angel 1988
The Gentleman 1990
The Yankee 1990
Salt of the Earth 1991
The Letter of the Law 1991
Once in a Blue Moon 1995
The Last Groom on Earth 1996

The Sky series
The Golden Sky 1981
The Sapphire Sky 1981
The Summer Sky 1982
The Amber Sky 1982

Omnibus in collaboration
Tumbleweed Christmas in "Historical Christmas Stories"	1989
Daddy's Home (with Mary Lynn Baxter and Naomi Horton)
Jesse's wife in "Promised Brides" 1994 (with Mary Jo Putney and Julie Tetel)
The Gentleman in "The Gentleman and The Hellraiser" 1997 (with Dorothy Glenn)

As Sharon Stephens
Medievals Norwen series
The Black Earl (1982)

As Candace Camp

Medievals Norwen series
The Black Earl (1995) (Originally as Sharon Stephens, 1982)
Evensong (1995)

Single novels
Rosewood (1991)
Heirloom (1992)
Suddenly (1996)
Scandalous (1996)
Impulse (1997)
Indiscreet (1997)
Impetuous (1998)
Swept Away (1999)

The Lily series
Rain Lily (1993)
Flame Lily (1994)

Montford Heirs series
Stolen Heart (2000)
Promise Me Tomorrow (2000)
No Other Love (2001)

A Little Town in Texas series
Hard-headed Texan (2001)
Smooth-talking Texan (2002)

Aincourt's hearts series
So Wild a Heart (2002)
The Hidden Heart (2002)
Secrets of the Heart (2003)

Crazy Moreland Family series
Mesmerized (2003)
Beyond Compare (2004)
Winterset (2004)
An Unexpected Pleasure (2005)

Women and Men series
An Independent Woman (2006)
A Dangerous Man (2007)

The Matchmakers series
The Marriage Wager (2007)
The Bridal Quest (2008)
The Wedding Challenge (2008)
The Courtship Dance (2009)

The Willowmere series
A Lady Never Tells (2010)
A Gentleman Always Remembers (2010)
An Affair Without End (formerly titled A Diamond Never Deceives) (2011)

Legend of St. Dwynwen series
 A Winter Scandal (2011)
 A Summer Seduction (2012)
 The Marrying Season (2013)

Omnibus in collaboration
Tabloid Baby (1998) (in "Maternity Leave" with Cait London and Sherryl Woods)
Somebody's Else Baby (2003) (in "Baby and All" with Myrna Mackenzie and Victoria Pade)
Nine-month Knight / Paternity Test / Tabloid Baby (2004) (with Cait London and Sherryl Woods)
Small Wonders (2004) (with Ann Major, Raye Morgan and Dallas Schulze)
Motherhood (2005) (with Elizabeth Bevarly and Diana Palmer)
Breaking Line in More Than Words Volume 5 (2009) (with Tara Taylor Quinn, Stephanie Bond, Brenda Jackson and Heather Graham)

References and sources

External links
 Official Website

1949 births
Living people
Novelists from Texas
University of Texas at Austin alumni
American romantic fiction novelists
20th-century American novelists
21st-century American novelists
Women romantic fiction writers
American women novelists
20th-century American women writers
21st-century American women writers